Twin Wasp may refer to one of three engines of the Pratt & Whitney Wasp series:

Pratt & Whitney R-1830 Twin Wasp
Pratt & Whitney R-1535 Twin Wasp Junior
Pratt & Whitney R-2180-E Twin Wasp E

See also
Pratt & Whitney R-2180-A Twin Hornet